The 2020–21 NCAA Division I FCS football season, part of college football in the United States, was organized by the National Collegiate Athletic Association (NCAA) at the Division I Football Championship Subdivision (FCS) level.

The regular season and postseason were impacted by the COVID-19 pandemic in the United States. Multiple FCS conferences moved their scheduled games from the fall of 2020 to the spring of 2021, and in August 2020, the NCAA announced that the FCS postseason would also be delayed.

While the NCAA at one point announced a cancellation of the FCS playoff, in late September 2020 a revised playoff schedule was announced, with the FCS Championship Game played on May 16, 2021. The championship was won by the Sam Houston State Bearkats.

Conference changes and new programs

Membership changes

Presbyterian played the 2020–21 season as an FCS independent, but in a scheduling agreement with the non-scholarship FCS Pioneer Football League, which it fully joined in July 2021. Under the agreement, Presbyterian was not eligible for the PFL title, but was eligible for the league's individual awards and honors. Presbyterian remains a full but non-football Big South member. Robert Morris, which moved from the football-sponsoring Northeast Conference to the non-football Horizon League in July 2020, was originally intended to join Big South football in 2021, but after the conference moved its football season from fall 2020 to spring 2021, Robert Morris was added several months ahead of schedule.

The 2020–21 season was the last for Bethune–Cookman, Florida A&M, and North Carolina A&T in the Mid-Eastern Athletic Conference. On July 1, 2021, Bethune–Cookman and Florida A&M moved to the Southwestern Athletic Conference and North Carolina A&T moved to the Big South Conference.

On January 14, 2021, the Western Athletic Conference, which had last played football in the 2012 season as an FBS league, announced that it would reinstate football in the fall 2021 season as an FCS league. This coincided with the arrival of four new members from the Southland Conference, all located in Texas and fielding FCS football programs—Abilene Christian, Lamar, Sam Houston State, and Stephen F. Austin. Original plans were for the four Southland members, as well as Big Sky Conference member Southern Utah, to join in 2022, at which time the football league would restart. However, the entry of the Texas schools and the restart of football were moved forward to July 2021 when the Southland chose to expel its departing members.  These schools joined Dixie State and Tarleton State, which had joined the all-sports WAC in July 2020, in the revived WAC football league. Southern Utah's entry remains on the original July 2022 schedule. On the same day, UTRGV, currently a full but non-football WAC member, announced that it planned to launch an FCS football program no later than 2024. While it did not mention a conference affiliation, its existing WAC membership makes it all but certain that the school will join WAC football.

On January 29, 2021, the ASUN Conference announced that it too would begin sponsoring FCS football in 2022, with its first five members being full members Kennesaw State and North Alabama (at the time football-only members of the Big South Conference), Eastern Kentucky and Jacksonville State from the Ohio Valley Conference, and Central Arkansas from the Southland Conference. EKU, JSU, and UCA will play football in the WAC for the 2021 season before moving to the ASUN for 2022. (These moves were necessary for the WAC to meet the 6-member minimum for 2021, since Dixie State and Tarleton State did not count toward the minimum as transitional members.)

Rule changes
The following playing rule changes were approved by the NCAA Playing Rules Oversight Panel for 2020:
 Players ejected for targeting will now be permitted to remain in the bench area. Previously, players ejected for targeting had to return to the locker room.
 Restricting the number of players on a team wearing the same uniform number to two; such players still cannot be on the field at the same time and must play different positions.
 Including the number "0" as a legal uniform number.
 Extending the official's jurisdiction prior to kickoff from 60 to 90 minutes, requiring a coach from each team be on the field during warm-ups, and identifying each player by number.
 Defensive teams are allowed to briefly have twelve players on the field to anticipate the offensive formation, however having twelve (or more) players on the field at the snap is a live-ball five-yard penalty for illegal substitution.  Previously this foul was a dead-ball foul, called if the defense had twelve (or more) players on the field and the "snap is imminent".  
 Adopting as a guideline a maximum of 2 minutes for instant replay reviews. Exceptions will be allowed in "exceptionally complicated" or end-of-game situations.
 On personal fouls and unsportsmanlike conduct penalties committed by the defense during a play that results in a touchdown or after a touchdown but before the try, the offense has the option to enforce the penalty on the try, the ensuing kickoff, or on the succeeding spot (if in overtime).
 If the game clock expires at the end of a half, replay determines that time was remaining, and the game situation calls for the clock to start on the referee's signal, the half ends unless the replay determines that the clock should have stopped with 3 or more seconds left.

Other headlines
 May 12 – Timothy White, chancellor of the 23-campus California State University system, announced that it would remain in a virtual learning model for the 2020 fall term. Because NCAA president Mark Emmert publicly stated that athletics could not take place on a campus without students, this left the 2020 season in doubt for the system's two FCS schools, Big Sky Conference members Cal Poly and Sacramento State.
 May 19 – The NCAA announced its Academic Progress Rate (APR) sanctions for the 2020–21 school year. A total of fifteen programs in eight sports were declared ineligible for postseason play due to failure to meet the required APR benchmark, including the following Division I FCS football teams:
Howard
McNeese State
Prairie View A&M
Stephen F. Austin
 June 4 – Florida A&M University announced that it would leave the Mid-Eastern Athletic Conference for the Southwestern Athletic Conference after the 2020–21 school year.
 June 15 – Robert Morris University announced its departure from the Northeast Conference for the Horizon League effective July 1, 2020. Football is one of six sports sponsored by RMU that are not sponsored by the Horizon League. The football program was scheduled to join Big South Conference football in 2021. For the 2020 football team, the Colonials were to have played as an FCS independent. The fall 2020 schedule for the Robert Morris football team would have been played as non-conference. RMU was ultimately added to Big South football for its rescheduled spring 2021 season.
 June 25 – Bethune–Cookman University announced that it would leave the Mid-Eastern Athletic Conference for the Southwestern Athletic Conference after the 2020–21 school year.
 July 8 –  the Ivy League announced that no sports would be played until January 1, 2021, at the earliest, because of the COVID-19 pandemic. It has not yet been determined whether football will take place in the spring or not at all.
 July 13 – The Patriot League announced the cancellation of its fall sports season due to the COVID-19 pandemic. Similarly to the Ivy League, it has not been announced whether football will be canceled altogether or played in the spring.
 July 16 – The MEAC announces that no sports will be played in the fall, but that the possibility of playing fall sports, including football, in the spring, is still open. 
 July 17 – The Colonial Athletic Association announces that it will not play fall sports, but that teams still wishing to play football can compete as independents for the 2020 season. Due to the cancellation of the MEAC season, ESPN Events announced that the MEAC/SWAC Challenge and Celebration Bowl had both been canceled.
 July 19 – The SWAC announces that it has canceled fall sports but becomes the first conference to commit to playing football in the spring, with the announcement of a seven-game conference schedule preceded by an eight-week training schedule to start in January 2021.
 July 27 – The Pioneer Football League announces that it will play a conference-only schedule in 2020.
 July 29 – The Northeast Conference announces that it will postpone football and all other fall sports, and that its Council of Presidents will reconvene on October 1 to reevaluate its plans.
 August 7
 The Pioneer Football League announces that its fall football season will be canceled, with no announcement made with regard to playing in the spring.
 The Big Sky Conference announces the rescheduling of all fall sports for spring 2021, the second FCS conference to commit to playing football in the spring.
 August 10 – The Missouri Valley Football Conference announces that its fall football season will be postponed to spring of 2021.

"Week Zero"
The regular season began on Saturday, August 29 with a game involving two FCS teams.
 FCS Kickoff (Cramton Bowl, Montgomery, Alabama): Central Arkansas 24, Austin Peay 17

FCS team wins over FBS teams
There were two FCS victories over FBS teams in 2020–21.
October 23, 2020:
Jacksonville State 19, FIU 10
February 21, 2021:
Tarleton State 43, New Mexico State 17

Non-DI team wins over FCS teams
Two FCS teams lost to D-II teams in 2020–21.
November 7, 2020:
 34, Abilene Christian 21
April 1, 2021:
 21, Tarleton State 14

Conference standings
All teams played spring schedules, except where noted. The Ivy League did not play in either the fall or spring.

Playoff qualifiers

Automatic berths for conference champions

At large qualifiers

Abstentions
Ivy League – None
Mid-Eastern Athletic Conference – None
Southwestern Athletic Conference – Alabama A&M

Postseason
Due to the MEAC cancelling all fall sports for the 2020 season, the MEAC/SWAC Celebration Bowl (the one FCS bowl game) was canceled.

In late September 2020, the NCAA announced that the FCS postseason would take place in April and May 2021. Also announced was a reduction of participating teams from 24 to 16, with 10 automatic qualifiers. The first round of the playoffs was scheduled for April 24, with the Championship Game in mid-May, later set for May 16.

NCAA Division I playoff bracket

* Host institution

SWAC Championship Game

Patriot League Championship Game

Coaching changes

Preseason and in-season
This is restricted to coaching changes that took place on or after May 1, 2020. For coaching changes that occurred earlier in 2020, see 2019 NCAA Division I FCS end-of-season coaching changes.

End of season

See also
2020 NCAA Division I FCS football rankings
2020 NCAA Division I FBS football season
2020–21 NCAA Division III football season
2020 NAIA football season

References